The Aloof were a British electronic music group. They formed in London, England, in 1990. The group consisted of Ricky Barrow, Gary Burns, Jagz Kooner, Richard Thair, and Dean Thatcher. They were active during the 1990s, and released four studio albums: Cover the Crime (1994), Sinking (1996), Seeking Pleasure (1998), and This Constant Chase for Thrills (1999).

On the day of the death of Diana Princess of Wales, BBC Radio 1 played their instrumental, "The Last Stand", every thirty minutes for several hours.

Members
 Ricky Barrow - vocals
 Jagz Kooner - producer, keyboards, programming, engineering
 Gary Burns - keyboards, bass
 Dean Thatcher - keyboards
 Richard Thair - drums, percussion

Touring members
 Nick Abnett - bass (1994-1999)
 Dave Stone - guitar (1994-2000)
 Nick Strasburg - keyboards (1994) 
 Will Blanchard - drums (1994)
 Simon Hanson - drums (1998-1999)

Discography

Studio albums
 Cover the Crime (1994)
 Sinking (1996)
 Seeking Pleasure (1998)
 This Constant Chase for Thrills (1999)

Singles
 "Never Get Out the Boat" (1991) UK No. 98
 "Scooter" "The World as One" (1991)
 "On a Mission" (1992) UK No. 64
 "Purity" (1992)
 "Purity (Remixes)" (1992)
 "Agent O" (1994)
 "Cover the Crime" (1994)
 "Mind" (1994)
 "Society" "Drum (Live Mix)" (1994)
 "Favelas" (1995) UK No. 95
 "Stuck on the Shelf" (1995)
 "Wish You Were Here..." (1996) UK No. 61
 "One Night Stand" (1996) UK No. 30
 "Sinking" (1997)
 "What I Miss the Most" (1998) UK No. 70
 "Infatuated" (1999)
 "Doing It for the Money" (2000)

References

External links
 
 The Aloof at Myspace

English electronic music groups
British supergroups
Electronic music supergroups
Musical groups established in 1990
Musical groups from London